The Sharifian Caliphate of the Hejaz was an Arab Muslim caliphate proclaimed by the Sharifian rulers of the Hashemite Kingdom of the Hejaz in 1924, in lieu of the Ottoman Caliphate.

History 

The idea of the Sharifian Caliphate had been floating around since at least the 15th century. Toward the end of the 19th century, it started to gain importance due to the decline of the Ottoman Empire, which was heavily defeated in the Russo-Turkish War of 1877–1878. There is little evidence, however, that the idea of a Sharifian Caliphate ever gained wide grassroots support in the Middle East or anywhere else for that matter.

The Ottoman sultanate was abolished on 1 November 1922, in the midst of the Turkish War of Independence. The office of caliph, however, was retained for an additional sixteen months, during which it was held by Abdülmecid II. He served as caliph under the patronage of the newly founded Turkish Republic until 3 March 1924, when the Grand National Assembly of Turkey formally abolished the caliphate. Hussein bin Ali then proclaimed himself caliph, basing his claim on his prophetic ancestry and his control of Islam's two holiest mosques, the Masjid al-Haram and Al-Masjid al-Nabawi (collectively known as the Haramayn). Possession of the Haramayn was an indispensable condition for any caliph. According to The Times, Mehmed VI, the last Ottoman sultan and penultimate Ottoman caliph, sent a telegraph of support to Hussein after he had proclaimed himself caliph. Nevertheless, King Hussein's caliphate failed to receive wide recognition from the still-colonial Arab world and it was ended when the Hashemite family had to flee the Hejaz region after its capture by the Najdi Ikhwan forces of Ibn Saud (the founder of today's Saudi Arabia) in 1924–1925.

Last attempt 
A last attempt at restoring the caliphal office and style with ecumenical recognition was made by al-Ḥusayn ibn ‘Alī al-Hāshimī, King of Hejaz and Sharif of Mecca, who assumed both on 11 March 1924 and held them until 3 October 1924, when he passed the kingship to his son `Ali ibn al-Husayn al-Hashimi, who did not adopt the caliphal office and style.

References

1924 in international relations
1924 in Saudi Arabia
Caliphates
House of Hashim
Islamic organizations established in 1924
Former countries of the interwar period